The Flint Vehicles were a professional baseball team in Flint, Michigan from 1921 to 1926. They were a part of the Michigan–Ontario League and were preceded in the league by the Flint Halligens in 1919 and 1920.  In 1921, future Pittsburgh Steelers and Pittsburgh Penguins founder and owner Art Rooney played for the Flint Vehicles as an outfielder.

References

Sports in Flint, Michigan
Defunct baseball teams in Michigan
Baseball teams established in 1921
Baseball teams disestablished in 1926
Michigan State League teams
Michigan-Ontario League teams